The Afghan leopard gecko (Eublepharis macularius afghanicus) is one of the five subspecies of the common leopard gecko, a small to midsized lizard belonging to the family Gekkonidae. This subspecies was first discovered by entomologist Carl Julius Bernhard Börner in 1976. It is much smaller than other leopard gecko subspecies.

Distribution and habitat
The Afghan leopard gecko is native to southeastern Afghanistan along the Kabul River and its tributaries, its range extending into northern Pakistan. It can be found in the Hindu Kush Mountains. Its habitat includes rocky desert and sparse grassland, but it avoids sand. It does not live in large colonies and is most active in April and May.

Appearance
The adult is pale to bright yellow dorsally, with scattered black or blue spots. There is a continuous light vertebral stripe. There are dark or light reticulations (netlike patterns) on the head. The limbs are blotched and the tail has irregular dark markings. The juvenile typically has three yellow bars along the back.

The male is about 15 centimeters long from snout to tail-tip. Females average about 14 centimeters.

References

External links
 Afghan geckos
 Images

Eublepharis
Lizards of Asia
Reptiles of Afghanistan
Reptiles of Pakistan
Taxa named by Carl Julius Bernhard Börner
Reptiles described in 1976